Khalilovo (Xälil) is a rural locality (a village) in Staroakbulyakovsky Selsoviet, Karaidelsky District, Bashkortostan, Russia. The population was 224 as of 2010. There are 3 streets.

Geography 
Khalilovo is located 20 km northwest of Karaidel (the district's administrative centre) by road. Novy Akbulyak is the nearest rural locality.

References 

Rural localities in Karaidelsky District